Hazratganj is an underground metro station on the Red Line of the Lucknow Metro in Lucknow, India. It was opened to the public on 08 March 2019.

Station Layout

Entry/Exit

References

Lucknow Metro stations